Kusatsu may refer to:
 Kusatsu, Shiga, a city in western Japan
 Kusatsu Line, operated by JR West
MIO Biwako Kusatsu, local football club
 Kusatsu, Gunma, a town in eastern Japan
 Kusatsu (train), operated by JR East
Thespakusatsu Gunma, local football club
 Kusatsu Onsen, a hot spring resort in Gunma Prefecture, Japan
 Clyde Kusatsu, Japanese American actor

See also
 Kusatsu Station (disambiguation)
 Mount Kusatsu-Shirane, active stratovolcano in Kusatsu, Gunma, Japan